Rank comparison chart of air forces of Commonwealth of Nations states.

Officers

See also
Comparative air force enlisted ranks of the Commonwealth
Comparative air force officer ranks of the Americas
Ranks and insignia of NATO air forces officers

Notes

References

 
Military comparisons